Trinidad is a given name of Spanish origin that is often given in reference to the Christian doctrine of the Trinity, or one God in three persons. It is currently among the most popular names for girls in Chile.

Notes